The native form of this personal name is Szántó T. Gábor. This article uses the Western name order.

Gábor T. Szántó is a Hungarian novelist, screenwriter, poet, essayist and editor (Budapest, 1966— ).

Life 
Gábor T. Szántó was born in Budapest in 1966. He studied law and political science and graduated from Eötvös Loránd University Budapest. He has been a participant of the Iowa International Writing Program Residency in the United States (2003). 
Szántó is the editor-in-chief of the Hungarian Jewish monthly Szombat. His additional field of interest is researching and teaching Modern Jewish Literature.

Work 
He published a volume of two novellas, Mószer (The Informer) in 1997 and a novel in 2002: Keleti pályadvar, végállomas (Eastern Station, Last Stop)". His short story book Lágermikulás (The Crunch of Empty Boots) was published in 2004 followed by a collection of poems A szabadulás íze (The Taste of Escape) in 2010. His novel, Édeshármas (Threesome) appeared in 2012, his novel Kafka macskái (Kafka's Cats) in 2014, a volume of short stories 1945 és más történetek, (1945 and Other Stories) in 2017.
His latest book is a novel entitled Europa Symphony  (2019).

His novella (Mószer) appeared in German as In Schuld verstrickt (Edition Q, 1999). A volume of short stories (Обратный билет – Obratnij Bilet) came out in Russian at Text Publisher, 2008. His novel Kafka’s Cats was published in Turkey as Kafka’nın Kedileri (Epsilon, Kafka Kitap, 2018), in Czech as Kafkovy Kočky (Garamond, 2020), his short story book as 1945 e altre storie (Edizioni Anfora, 2021) in Italian and as 1945 a iné príbehy (Tatran, 2022) in Slovak. The volume will come out in China in 2022. His novel Europa Symphony was published in Bulgaria in 2022 as Симфония Европа and will be published in Turkey in 2023. 

The title story of his book 1945 és más történetek (2017) was translated into English as 1945 (Homecoming), German, French, Spanish, Russian, Dutch, Italian, Polish, Slovakian, Slovenian and Chinese and served as the basis of the internationally acclaimed film 1945 directed by Hungarian film director Ferenc Török was shot in production Katapultfilm. Cameraman: Elemér Ragályi, music: Tibor Szemző. The film is distributed in 40 countries.
 
Festival awards: 
- Miami Jewish Film Festival, Best Narrative, 2017
- 67th Berlin International Film Festival Panorama section, 3rd place Audience Award Fiction Film, 2017
- Titanic International Film Festival, Budapest, Audience Award, 2017
- Washington Jewish Film Festival, Audience Award, 2017
- Chattanooga Jewish Film Festival, Audience Award, 2017
- Berlin Jewish Film Festival, Best Directed Film, 2017
- 34th Jerusalem Film Festival, Yad Vashem Avner Shalev Prize for best artistic representation of Holocaust related topic, 2017
- 37th San Francisco Jewish Film Festival, San Francisco Critics Circle Award and Audience Award, 2017
- 30th Der neue Heimatfilm, Freistadt, Austria, Best Fiction Film, 2017
- Central European Film Festival, Timișoara, Romania, Best Film, 2017
- 19th Film by the Sea International Film Festival on Film and Literature, Vlissingen, The Netherlands, Main Prize
- Vienna Jewish Film Festival Audience Award, 2017
- Waterloo Historical Film Festival, Critic's Prize, 2017
- Warshaw Jewish Film Festival, Best Screenplay Award and Audience Award, 2017
- Australian Jewish International Film Festival Audience Award for Best Feature Film, 2017
- Main Prize of the Hungarian Film Critics, 2018
- 14. Jewish Motifs International Film Festival, Warshaw, Audience Award, 2018
- Traverse City Film Festival, 2018, Prize of Best Foreign Film

External links

Works 
 Kafka's Cats (excerpt from the novel)
 Threesome (Excerpt from the novel)
 The Crunch of Empty Boots
 A poem, short stories and an essay
 Summaries of two articles by Gabor T. Szanto

Book review 
 Miklós Győrffy: Apathy, Irony, Empathy. (Ajtony Árpád: "A birodalom elvesztése". Garaczi László: "Pompásan buszozunk!"; Szántó T. Gábor: "Mószer")
 Yehuda Lahav: Red, not dead (The Informer, Eastern station, last stop)
 George Gomori: Gabor T. Szanto. Lagermikulas, World Literature Today, September 1, 2005 (The Crunch of Empty Boots)

Film review 
 Berlin Film Review: '1945'

Interview 
 The word ‘Jew’ casts a long shadow
 "Who do I write for?" Interview with Gabor T. Szanto by Paul Varnai

1966 births
Living people
Writers from Budapest
Hungarian Jews
Hungarian male poets
20th-century Hungarian male writers
20th-century Hungarian novelists
20th-century Hungarian poets
21st-century Hungarian male writers
21st-century Hungarian novelists
21st-century Hungarian poets
Jewish poets
Jewish novelists
Hungarian journalists
Hungarian male novelists
International Writing Program alumni